Cannabis in New Hampshire is illegal for recreational use and decriminalized for possession of up to  as of July 18, 2017. Medical use is legal through legislation passed in 2013.

Medical cannabis (2013)
In July 2013, New Hampshire Governor Maggie Hassan signed into law a bill allowing the use of medical cannabis for patients with "chronic or terminal diseases" and "debilitating medical conditions." The bill was noted as one of the stricter medical marijuana bills in the nation, allowing cannabis only after all other treatment methods have failed. Hassan also modified the measure, prohibiting patients from growing their own cannabis.

Failed legalization (2014)

Decriminalization (2017)
On July 18, 2017, New Hampshire decriminalized cannabis, replacing misdemeanor charges with a $100 fine for a first or second offense and $300 for a third offense. Four offenses within three years would result in misdemeanor charges.

References